Murphy Rocks consists of two closely adjacent but very isolated rocks lying in the sea about  off the ice-cliff coastline of the Ingrid Christensen Coast, Princess Elizabeth Land, in the Vestfold Hills region of Antarctica. In January 1979 the first landings were made by helicopter on these rocks, during which survey station NM/S/268 was established.

The rocks are named for Brian Murphy, who made extensive surveys in the Vestfold Hills in 1978–79, including Doppler satellite fixes, a Tellurometer survey, heights by simultaneous reciprocal vertical angles and a site survey for a major re-building of Davis Station.

These rocks currently define the northeasternmost limit of ice-free rock areas of the Ingrid Christensen Coast, Princess Elizabeth Land, and, as such, form part of an extensive network of Adelie penguin rookeries located along this section of the coastline of Antarctica.

Survey station NM/S/270 lies on a true bearing of 75° 49' distant  from survey station NM/S/268.

See also 

Murphy Rocks, rocks in Mary Byrd Land, West Antarctica.

References 

Islands of Princess Elizabeth Land